WDA may refer to:

Government bodies
 Waste disposal authority, a UK statutory designation
 Welsh Development Agency, Wales (1976–2006)
 Singapore Workforce Development Agency (formed 2003)

Other uses
 Wardair, a Canadian airline
 Web Dynpro ABAP, a web application variant
 Wii de Asobu, a Japanese series of Wii video games